Richard Blome (1635-1705) was an engraver, cartographer, and publisher in the Kingdom of England.

Works

 1670 A Geographical Description of the Four Parts of the World 
 1673 Britannia, or a Geographical Description of the Kingdom of England, Scotland and Ireland (average size 315 x 280 mm)
 1681 Speed's Maps Epitomiz'd (average size 180 x 230 mm) 1685 Re-issued 1693 Re-issued in Cosmography and Geography 1715 Re-published by Thomas Taylor in England Exactly described c. 1750 Re-issued by Thomas Bakewell (1716–64)
 1682 Cosmography and Geography (by Bernhard Varen) 1683-93 Re-issued
 1686 The Gentlemans Recreation 
 1687 Isles and Territories of America for Anthony Earl of Shaftesbury (and in 1688 a French edition)

References

1635 births
1705 deaths
English cartographers
17th-century cartographers
17th-century English people